Přerov is a city in the Olomouc Region of the Czech Republic. It has about 41,000 inhabitants. It lies on the Bečva River. In the past it was a major crossroad in the heart of Moravia in the Czech Republic. The historic centre of the town is well preserved and is protected by law as an urban monument zone.

Administrative parts

Přerov is made up of 13 city parts and villages:

Přerov I-Město
Přerov II-Předmostí
Přerov III-Lověšice
Přerov IV-Kozlovice
Přerov V-Dluhonice
Přerov VI-Újezdec
Přerov VII-Čekyně
Přerov VIII-Henčlov
Přerov IX-Lýsky
Přerov X-Popovice
Přerov XI-Vinary
Přerov XII-Žeravice
Přerov XIII-Penčice

Geography

The eastern part of the municipal territory is located in the Moravian Gate lowlands, the western part in the Upper Morava Valley. A small northern part extends into the Tršice Highlands.

History

Settlement in the locality dates back to prehistoric times. A locality called Skalka in Předmostí city part is known worldwide for its rich archaeological discoveries dating mainly from the Paleolithic period. Discoveries include excavations of a large number of mammoth bones, sites of mammoth hunters' camps from 27–26 thousand years ago, and others. Together with Dolní Věstonice it is the most important archaeological site in the country.

The first written mention of Přerov is in a deed of bishop Jindřich Zdík from 1141 and testifies to Přerov's administrative function in the castle system of the Přemyslid state. King Ottokar II of Bohemia gave Přerov the privilege of being a royal town in 1256.

An old stone fortress was built here in the first half of the 13th century. It was conquered and damaged during the Hussite Wars. In 1487, Přerov was acquired by the Pernštejn family. Vilém of Pernštejn had rebuilt the Horní Square and the fortress, which became a solid Gothic castle. The hill around the castle was colonized by new settlers, including members of the Unity of the Brethren, thanks to which the town became a centre of culture and education in the 16th century.

In the second half of the 16th century, reconstruction of the castle into a Renaissance residence began. In the late 16th century, Přerov was bought by Karel the Elder of Zierotin, who chose the town as his seat. He had finished the reconstruction of the castle. During his reign the town experienced prosperity. After the Battle of White Mountain, Zierotin was forced to moved away and the town lost its importance.

In 1841 the railroad to Přerov was built and the town has become an important railway junction. In the second half of the 19th century there has been rapid economic growth, driven primarily by the production of agricultural machinery.

German terror in Bohemia and Moravia peaked in spring 1945, sparking a Czech uprising, which started in Přerov on 1 May and then spread throughout the whole country after the murder of 78,154 Czech Jews and 340,000 Czech citizens during the German occupation. In June 1945, during the expulsion of Germans from Czechoslovakia, 71 men, 120 women and 74 children were killed in a massacre of the German population. 

On 1 July 2006, the town of Přerov became a statutory city.

Demographics

Economy

The main employer based in the city is Meopta - optika, a multinational company manufacturing various products mainly in the field of optics. It was founded in 1933.

Other major industrial companies include PRECHEZA (representative of the chemical industry founded in 1894, owned by Agrofert) and DPOV (a subsidiary of České dráhy focused on repairs and modernization of railway rolling stock).

Přerov is known for the Zubr Brewery. The brewery was founded in 1872.

Transport
The city is a major railway junction with main lines to Prague via Olomouc, Warsaw via Ostrava, and Vienna via Břeclav, and a regional line to Brno.

A public domestic and private international airport is located in Přerov. It was established in 2013 by transformation from original military airport Přerov–Bochoř.

Education

In Přerov there is the College of Logistics, a private technical college of non-university type.

Sport
HC Zubr Přerov – ice hockey club (plays in the 2nd tier)
SK Žeravice – handball club (plays in the 3nd tier)
1. FC Viktorie Přerov – association football club (plays in the 4th tier)
Přerov Mammoths –  american football club (plays in the 1st tier)
TK PRECHEZA Přerov – tennis club that organizes an international women's tournament Zubr Cup
Auto Klub Přerov – motor sports club

Sights

The historic town centre is formed by Horní Square and its immediate surroundings, delimited by the preserved town walls. Horní Square is lined by Renaissance burgher houses. The most valuable house is the so-called Corvinus' House from 1570, with a preserved Renaissance portal.

The landmark of the square in the Přerov Castle. The Renaissance castle has preserved Gothic core and stone elements from the original fortress. Today it houses the Comenius Museum, founded in 1887.

There is five church buildings in Přerov. The oldest is the parish Church of Saint Lawrence from 1725–1732.

Mammoth Hunters Memorial in Předmostí is an exhibition pavilion, which presents this archeological site and its discoveries.

Notable people

Jan Blahoslav (1523–1571), developer of Czech grammar 
John Amos Comenius (1592–1670), pedagogue and theologia; taught at Přerov Latin school in 1614–18, having earlier studied there
Franz Petrasch (1744–1820) Austrian general in the Habsburg military during the French Revolutionary Wars
Rudolf Weigl (1883–1957), Polish biologist and inventor
Liane Zimbler (1892–1987), architect
Karel Janoušek (1893–1971), senior Czechoslovak Air Force officer
Ida Ehre (1900–1989), actor and theatre director and manager
Edouard Borovansky (1902–1959), ballet dancer
Vilém Tauský (1910–2004), conductor and composer
Eliška Kleinová (1912–1999), pianist and music educator
Josef Kainar (1917–1971), poet 
Gideon Klein (1919–1945), composer and pianist
Jiřina Hauková (1919–2005), poet and translator
František Šolc (1920–1996), French hornist and horn teacher
Vladimír Hučín (born 1952), political prisoner, secret service agent; lives here, honorary citizen of Přerov
Karel Plíhal (born 1958), singer and musician
Ctislav Doseděl (born 1970), tennis player
Petr Ruman (born 1976), footballer
Tomáš Cigánek (born 1978), footballer
Jani Galik (born 1984), footballer
Josef Hrabal (born 1985), ice hockey player
Tomáš Kundrátek (born 1989), ice hockey player
Kateřina Sokolová (born 1989), Miss World contestant

Twin towns – sister cities

Přerov is twinned with:

 Bardejov, Slovakia
 Cuijk, Netherlands
 Děčín, Czech Republic
 Ivano-Frankivsk, Ukraine
 Kedzierzyn-Kozle, Poland
 Kotor, Montenegro
 Ozimek, Poland

References

External links

Prerovan.cz - Information portal of Přerov District 
Comenius Museum in Přerov

Populated places in Přerov District
Cities and towns in the Czech Republic